Red bean paste or red bean jam, also called adzuki bean paste or anko (a Japanese word), is a paste made of red beans (also called "adzuki beans"), used in East Asian cuisine. The paste is prepared by boiling the beans, then mashing or grinding them. At this stage, the paste can be sweetened or left as it is. The color of the paste is usually dark red, which comes from the husk of the beans. In Korean cuisine, the adzuki beans (often the black variety) can also be husked prior to cooking, resulting in a white paste. It is also possible to remove the husk by sieving after cooking, but before sweetening, resulting in a red paste that is smoother and more homogeneous.

Etymology

Strictly speaking, the term an can refer to almost any sweet, edible, mashed paste, although without qualifiers red beans are assumed, while  refers specifically to the paste made with red beans.

Similarly, the Chinese term dòushā, applies to red bean paste when used without qualifiers, although hóngdòushā explicitly means "red bean paste."

In Korean, pat ("V. angularis") contrasts with kong ("bean"), rather than being considered a type of it. Kong ("beans") without qualifiers usually means soybeans. As so means "filling", the word patso means "pat filling", with unsweetened dark-red paste as its prototype. Dan ("sweet") attached to patso makes danpat-so, the sweetened red bean paste, which is often called danpat ("sweet pat"). Geopi ("hulled, skinned, peeled, shelled, etc.") attached to pat makes geopipat, the dehulled red beans and the white paste made of geopipat is called geopipat-so.

Types
Red bean paste is graded according to its consistency, sweetness, and color.

Chinese
In Chinese cuisine, the most common types are:
 Mashed Adzuki beans are boiled with sugar and mashed. The paste is smooth with bits of broken beans and bean husk. Depending on the intended texture, the beans can be vigorously or lightly mashed. Some unmashed beans can also be added back into the bean paste for additional texture. This is the most common and popular type of red bean paste eaten in Chinese confections. It can also be eaten on its own or in sweet soups.
 Smooth Adzuki beans are boiled without sugar, mashed, and diluted into a slurry. The slurry is then strained through a sieve to remove the husk, filtered, and squeezed dry using cheesecloth. Although the dry paste can be directly sweetened and used, oil, either vegetable oil or lard, is usually used to cook the dry paste and improve its texture and mouth feel. Smooth bean paste is mainly used as a filling for Chinese pastries.

Japanese
In Japanese cuisine and confectionery, the most common types are:
 Tsubuan: Whole red beans are boiled with sugar but otherwise untreated.
 Tsubushian: The beans are mashed after boiling.
 Koshian: The beans are passed through a sieve to remove bean skins. This is the most common type.
 Sarashian: The beans are dried and reconstituted with water.
 Ogura-an: Is a mix of koshian and tsubuan.

Korean

In Korean cuisine and confectionery, the most common types are:
 Patso, dark-red paste made by boiling and then mashing or grinding red beans. The bean skins may or may not be removed by sifting the paste through a sieve to make the paste smoother.
 Danpat or danpat-so, sweetened red bean paste, made by adding honey or sugar when making patso. The bean skins are often removed to make the paste smoother.
 Geopipat-so, white paste made by boiling dehulled red beans, and then mashing or grinding them.

Uses

Chinese
Red bean paste is used in many Chinese dishes, such as:
 Red bean soup (pinyin: hóng dòu tāng / hóng dòu shā): In some recipes,  red bean paste with more water added to form a tong sui, or thick, sweet soup. It is often cooked and eaten with tangyuan and lotus seeds. This is almost always a dessert.
 Tangyuan (pinyin: tāng yúan): Glutinous rice balls filled with sweet fillings such as red bean paste and boiled in plain or sweetened water.
 Sweet zongzi (pinyin: zòng zi): Glutinous rice and red bean paste wrapped with bamboo leaves and steamed or boiled. The glutinous rice used to make zongzi is usually specially prepared and appears yellow.
 Mooncakes (yùe bĭng): A baked pastry consisting of thin dough surrounding a filling. The filling is traditionally made from various ingredients, including mashed lotus seeds, red bean paste, or other fillings. The texture of this filling is quite similar to straight red bean paste. It is most commonly eaten during the Mid-Autumn Festival. 
 Bāozi (pinyin: dòu shā bāo): Steamed leavened bread filled with a variety of savoury or sweet fillings.
 Jiān dui: Fried pastry made from glutinous rice flour, sometimes filled with red bean paste.
 Red bean cake: It is a type of Asian cake with a sweet red bean paste filling. It is made primarily with adzuki beans.
 Red bean pancake

Japanese
Red bean paste is used in many Japanese sweets.
 Anmitsu, a dessert consisting of red bean paste, small cubes of agar jelly, and pieces of fruit served with syrup.
 Anpan, a sweet bun filled with red bean paste.
 Daifuku, a confection consisting of a small round rice cake stuffed with red bean paste.
 Anko dango, a dumpling made from rice flour that is sometimes topped or filled with red bean paste.
 Dorayaki, a confection consisting of two small pancake-like patties made from castella wrapped around a filling of red bean paste.
 Imagawayaki, a paste is in the pancake. Also known as Ōban-yaki.
 Manjū, a steamed cake filled with red bean paste.
 Oshiruko or Zenzai, adzuki bean soup, commonly served with rice cake.
 Sakuramochi, a Japanese sweet consisting of sweet pink-colored rice cake (mochi) with a red bean paste (anko) center, and wrapped in a pickled cherry blossom (sakura) leaf.  
 Taiyaki, a fish-shaped cake stuffed with red bean paste.
 Yōkan, a thick jellied dessert made of red bean paste, agar, and sugar.

Korean
Red bean paste is used in various Korean snack foods and desserts, including:
 Baram-tteok, a type of tteok filled with white geopipat-so.
 Bungeo-ppang, a fish-shaped pastry filled with sweet danpat-so.
 Chalbori-ppang, two small and sweet pancakes wrapping around sweet danpat-so.
 Chapssal doughnut, a glutinous rice doughnut filled with sweet danpat-so.
 Gyeongdan, a rice ball cake filled with sweet danpat-so. 
 Hodu-gwaja, a walnut-shaped cookie filled with sweet danpat-so.
 Hoppang, a warm fluffy pastry filled with sweet danpat-so or sweet nokdu-so (mung bean paste).
 Hwangnam-ppang, a pastry with a chrysanthemum imprinted on the top, filled with sweet danpat-so.
 Jjinppang, a warm fluffy pastry filled with unsweetened patso, usually with the skins of the red beans.
 Kkulppang, a sweet pastry covered with sweet danpat-so and covered with corn syrup.
 Patbingsu, a type of shaved ice.
 Songpyeon, a type of tteok filled with various fillings including unsweetened patso, sweetened (danpat-so), or white (geopipat-so).
 Ttongppang, a poo-shaped pastry filled with sweet danpat-so.

See also

 Adzuki bean
 Black bean paste
 List of legume dishes
 Sweet bean paste

References

East Asian condiments
Food paste
Legume dishes
Wagashi